Plectophila acrochroa is a moth in the family Xyloryctidae. It was described by Turner in 1900. It is found in Australia, where it has been recorded from New South Wales and Queensland.

The wingspan is about 20 mm. The forewings are snow-white with a narrow ochreous streak along the costa from before the middle to three-fourths, slightly broader towards the apex, where it ends in a short, very oblique fuscous streak. There is a small triangular orange-ochreous spot on the costa just before the apex, bounded beneath by a fuscous line. The hindwings are whitish grey.

References

Plectophila
Moths described in 1900